Brian Patrick Bannister (born February 28, 1981) is an American director of pitching for the San Francisco Giants. He is a former professional baseball starting pitcher who played for the New York Mets and Kansas City Royals of Major League Baseball (MLB) from 2006 through 2010. He played college baseball as a walk-on for the University of Southern California. Bannister was selected by the Mets in the seventh round of the 2003 MLB draft. He previously served as assistant pitching coach and vice president of pitching development for the Boston Red Sox.

Amateur career
Bannister was born in Scottsdale, Arizona. He had a remarkable high school career at Chaparral High School, former home of Chicago White Sox star Paul Konerko, as he was named All-Region and All-City in 1997, 1998 and 1999. Chaparral was the runner-up to the state title in 1997 and 1998, but in Bannister's senior year, he helped take home the state championship by striking out seven of the nine batters he faced in the championship game.

He began his college career as a walk-on at the University of Southern California. Entering as a second baseman, he became a full-time pitcher before the start of his freshman season. He posted an ERA of 4.35 in ten games out of the bullpen in his freshman year. Acting as the team closer during his 2001 sophomore campaign, he compiled a 2.80 ERA in thirty-five relief appearances. Bannister helped the Trojans to the College World Series in both 2000 and 2001 while pitching alongside former Major Leaguers Mark Prior and Anthony Reyes. After the 2001 season, he played collegiate summer baseball with the Brewster Whitecaps of the Cape Cod Baseball League. He redshirted in 2002, due to arthroscopic elbow surgery to remove impinged scar tissue in his elbow. He was drafted by the Boston Red Sox in 2002, but did not sign. He returned to the Trojans in 2003 to play his junior year, which was also his first year as a starter. In eighteen games (fourteen starts), Bannister compiled a 6–5 record with an ERA of 4.53.

Professional career

Bannister was drafted by the Mets in the seventh round of the 2003 amateur draft and, after signing, was assigned to the Class-A Brooklyn Cyclones. There he put together a strong season, posting a 4–1 record with an ERA of 2.15 in twelve games (nine starts) and was named a New York–Penn League Postseason All-Star. In 2004, Bannister was assigned to play for High-A St. Lucie in the Florida State League, where he put together a 5–7 record with a 4.24 ERA in twenty starts and was a Florida State League All-Star. His experimentation with throwing a two-seam fastball and circle changeup led to this decline in numbers, but prepared him for the competition at higher levels of professional baseball. Bannister was then promoted to AA Binghamton following the trade of Scott Kazmir to the Tampa Bay Devil Rays, where he had a 3–3 record and an ERA of 4.08 in a mere eight starts. After the 2004 season, Bannister played for the Peoria Saguaros of the Arizona Fall League. He posted strong numbers, going 2–0 with a 3.77 ERA against the top prospects in the minor leagues. More importantly, he developed his cut fastball while in the AFL, which would develop into one of his strongest pitches. The next year, Bannister began the 2005 season in Double-A Binghamton, where he posted numbers that reflected the quality of his newly developed pitches: a 9–4 record with a 2.56 ERA in eighteen starts. This earned him an All-Star selection for the third consecutive season, and the honor of starting pitcher for the Double-A All-Star Game. This display caused Bannister to earn a promotion to AAA Norfolk, where he showed further promise against better competition. He finished his AAA campaign with a 4–1 record and an ERA of 3.18 in eight starts.

2006

At 25 years old, Bannister made his Major League debut against the Washington Nationals. His first major league win came in his second start, also against Washington, on April 11, 2006. A former second baseman, Bannister also excelled at the plate, acquiring four hits in his first ten at-bats, including three doubles.

After making five starts, Bannister was put on the 15-day disabled list with a strained right hamstring which he injured while running the bases in the fifth inning of an April 26 game against San Francisco. Bannister was later moved to the 60-day DL. Bannister made 5 starts for the Mets and had a record of 2–0 with a 2.89 ERA.

Bannister spent a month on a Minor League rehab assignment, pitching for the St. Lucie Mets and the Norfolk Tides. When Orlando Hernández was unable to pitch in late August, Bannister made a spot start against the Phillies, giving up 4 runs in 6 innings in a 4–3 loss. The game was Bannister's first major league defeat. Immediately after the game, Bannister was optioned to AAA Norfolk to allow Óliver Pérez to make a spot start the following day. Bannister returned to the Mets for the month of September and made two relief appearances. On September 6, 2006, the Brooklyn Cyclones honored Bannister with his own bobblehead and retired his number, 19. Bannister was the first pitcher from the Cyclones to make his Major League debut with the Mets.

Because his hamstring injury reduced the number of innings pitched in 2006, Bannister joined the Tomateros de Culiacán in the Mexican Pacific League. He won in his debut, pitching five innings against the Algodoneros de Guasave. After completing the first half of the season with the Tomateros, Bannister returned home with a 3–2 record and a 3.68 ERA.

On December 5, 2006, during the MLB Winter Meetings, Bannister was traded from the New York Mets to the Kansas City Royals for relief pitcher Ambiorix Burgos.

2007
In spring 2007, Bannister's high school jersey number, 15, was retired alongside former Chaparral High School players Darryl Deak, Brian Deak, coach Mark Miller, and former Chicago White Sox star Paul Konerko.

On April 24, 2007, Bannister made his debut with the Royals against the Chicago White Sox.  He gave up 4 runs, 3 of them earned runs, in 4 and 1/3 innings, and was not involved in the decision.

In June 2007, Bannister was one of two major league pitchers to win 5 games, going 5–1 with a 2.75 ERA in six starts, including a streak of 18 innings without an earned run, and was named AL Rookie of the Month. He also received the same award in August after winning 4 games in the month.

On August 16, 2007, Bannister threw his first career complete game, a four-hitter against the A's. He threw 111 pitches, 73 for strikes.

Bannister finished 3rd in the 2007 American League Rookie of the Year voting, after finishing 12–9 with a 3.87 ERA. He received 1 first place vote, 8 second place votes, and 7 third place votes.

Bannister was selected to the 2007 Topps Major League Rookie All-Star Team.  The selection was the result of the 49th annual Topps balloting of Major League managers.

2008
In 2008, he was named the Royals' number-2 starter behind Gil Meche. He led the majors in grand slams allowed, with four. He regressed from his 2007 form, and saw his ERA spike from 3.87 to 5.76. He finished with among the highest loss totals for starting pitchers that year, finishing 9–16.  On 8/17/2008 against The Yankees, Bannister gave up 10 earned runs on 10 hits (3 homeruns) and 3 walks while pitching only one complete inning. In this year, his daughter Brynn was born on October 11.

2009
After a poor 2008, Bannister started the 2009 season with AAA Omaha before promptly being called up a week later to fill the number 5 spot in the rotation. After adding a new changeup to his repertoire, his ground ball rate increased and he had a 7–7 record and a 3.59 ERA into early August, ranking in the Top 10 in the American League in ERA and being the subject of numerous trade deadline rumors. Unfortunately, he suffered a season-ending right rotator cuff tear in a 117 pitch game August 3 against Tampa Bay. After attempting to pitch with the injury and losing five consecutive starts, he was placed on the disabled list for the rest of the season. He finished the year compiling a record of 7–12 with a 4.73 ERA.

2010
Bannister spent the winter rehabilitating his shoulder and returned to what would be his last MLB season. His ineffectiveness was obvious, and he struggled with giving up home runs and pitching deep into games. On June 23, 2010, Bannister and the Royals handed Washington Nationals phenom Stephen Strasburg his first career loss in a 1–0 victory in Washington. His season finished with a miserable loss at Cincinnati, a minor league rehab stint, and a loss to the Minnesota Twins.

In 2010, he was chosen as "honorable mention" in a list of the smartest athletes in sports by Sporting News.

2011
In January 2011, Bannister signed a two-year contract to play for Japan's Yomiuri Giants. In March, Bannister retired following the earthquake and tsunami in Northern Japan, stating he had no further plans to play in either Japan or the United States. He currently runs a fund that supports non-profit organizations for families in crisis in the San Francisco Bay Area.

Post-playing career
During his pitching career, Bannister became known in baseball for his interest in scouting and player analysis and evaluation. He became interested in statistical analysis and Sabermetrics such as FIP and UZR as means of determining a player's true value. On January 13, 2015, Bannister joined the Boston Red Sox as a member of its professional scouting department.  On September 9, 2015, he was promoted by Red Sox president of baseball operations Dave Dombrowski to a new position, director of pitching analysis and development. On July 6, 2016, Bannister was promoted to assistant pitching coach. On November 3, 2016, he was promoted to vice president of pitching development, in addition to his role as assistant pitching coach. After the 2019 season, he was taken off the coaching staff while remaining as vice president of pitching development, until leaving the Red Sox to take a position with the San Francisco Giants in December 2019. His title with the Giants is director of pitching, and he is listed as a member of the team's uniformed coaching staff.

Photography career
Bannister is an avid photographer and photography supporter. He is the founder of a full-service photography studio complex and equipment rental house in Phoenix, Arizona. He graduated cum laude from the University of Southern California with a Bachelor of Arts degree from the School of Fine Arts. His work has been featured in The New York Times, New York Daily News, and American Photo.

Personal
Bannister is married and has one daughter, Brynn, who was born in the 2008 offseason. In 2011, his son Atley was born in December. He is a devout Christian and the oldest son of former Major League All-Star pitcher Floyd Bannister, who pitched from 1977 to 1992 with Houston, Seattle, Chicago (AL), Kansas City, California, and Texas.  His uncle, Greg Cochran, also played in the Yankees' and Athletics' minor league systems. His brother Brett spent time as a pitcher in the Mariners' system, and his brother Cory pitched at Stanford. Brian and Brett are both members of Lambda Chi Alpha fraternity.

See also
 List of second-generation Major League Baseball players

References

External links

 Brian Bannister verified Twitter account

1981 births
Living people
Baseball players from Scottsdale, Arizona
Baseball players from Phoenix, Arizona
Binghamton Mets players
Boston Red Sox coaches
Boston Red Sox scouts
Brewster Whitecaps players
Brooklyn Cyclones players
Kansas City Royals players
Major League Baseball pitchers
Major League Baseball pitching coaches
New York Mets players
Norfolk Tides players
Omaha Royals players
St. Lucie Mets players
USC Trojans baseball players